Zhao Liang may refer to:

Zhao Liang (circus performer) (born 1982), Chinese circus performer known for his record-setting height
Zhao Liang (director) (born circa 1971), Chinese documentary filmmaker
Zhao Liang (football), Chinese football referee
Zhao Liang (actor), Chinese actor credited as Liang Zhao (Red Firecracker, Green Firecracker)
Zhao Liang Pi author of Hsuan wei Hshin